The Burns' Day Storm (also known as Cyclone Daria) was an extremely violent windstorm that took place on 25–26 January 1990 over North-Western Europe. It is one of the strongest European windstorms on record. This storm has received different names, as there was no official list of such events in Europe at the time. Starting on Burns Day, the birthday of the Scottish poet Robert Burns, it caused widespread damage and hurricane-force winds over a wide area.

Meteorological history 

The storm began as a cold front over the Northern Atlantic Ocean on 23 January. It made landfall on the morning of January 25 over Ireland. It then tracked over to Ayrshire in Scotland. After hitting the United Kingdom, the storm tracked rapidly east towards Denmark and caused major damage and 30 deaths in the Netherlands and Belgium.

Winds
The Great Storm of 1987 contained considerably higher wind speeds across every parameter but affected a smaller area of the UK. Both highest recorded sustained wind speeds of 86 mph and highest gust of 135 mph for example. Sustained periods of high gust speeds were also far higher in 1987. However, during the 1987 storm, many anemometers stopped recording because of power outages, breakages by the excess wind speeds and measurement maxima being exceeded. By 1990, the meteorological community had newer devices that remained independent of external power and could measure higher wind speeds. The general opinion is that wind speeds measured during the Burns' Day Storm provide an accurate picture, but there is a tendency to downplay windspeeds from the 1987 storm because of the patchy data available. In the 1987 storm, it was the counties of Sussex, Surrey, Kent and Essex (i.e. the SE of England) which were worst hit and suffered the most damage. Met Office forecaster of the day, Michael Fish became notoriously infamous by assuring a lady enquirer that "there was not going to be a 'hurricane'".

Forecasting
The Burns' Day Storm of 1990 has been given as an example of when the Met Office "got the prediction right". The model forecast hinged on observations from two ships in the Atlantic near the developing storm the day before it reached the UK.

During the day of the storm, the Royal Netherlands Meteorological Institute (KNMI) increased warnings to force 11 and eventually to hurricane force 12. It conducted research that most of the general public could not understand the severity of the warnings. The storm has led to more awareness and understanding of storminess among the public by the KNMI, which started a teletext page and the introduction of special warnings for extreme weather events in reaction to these findings.

Impacts 

Casualties were much higher than those of the Great Storm of 1987 because the storm hit during the daytime. The storm caused extensive damage, with approximately 3 million trees downed, power disrupted to over 500,000 homes and severe flooding in England and West Germany. The storm cost insurers in the UK £3.37 billion, the UK's most expensive weather event to insurers. Most of the deaths were caused by collapsing buildings or falling debris. In one case in Sussex, a class of children was evacuated just minutes before their school building collapsed. The actor Gorden Kaye was also injured during the storm when a plank of an advertising board was blown through his car's windscreen.

See also
 Vivian (storm) 25–28 February 1990, later Wiebke . This is called the 1990 storm series.
 List of natural disasters in Great Britain and Ireland
 Great Storm of 1987
 European windstorm

References

External links
 On this Day by the BBC

Burns' Day Storm
Burns' Day Storm
Burns' Day Storm
Burns' Day Storm
1990 meteorology
1990 disasters in the United Kingdom
Robert Burns
Power outages in the United Kingdom
January 1990 events in Europe
Storm
Storm
Storm
Storm
Storm
1990 in France
1990 in Belgium
1990 in Denmark
1990 in the Netherlands
1990 disasters in Europe